The rufous-breasted leaftosser (Sclerurus scansor) is a species of bird in the family Furnariidae. It is found in Brazil and eastern Paraguay. Its natural habitats are subtropical or tropical moist lowland forest and subtropical or tropical moist montane forest.

References

rufous-breasted leaftosser
Birds of Brazil
Birds of the Atlantic Forest
rufous-breasted leaftosser
Taxonomy articles created by Polbot